The 2010 FA Trophy Final was the 40th final of the Football Association's cup competition for levels 5–8 of the English football league system. The match was contested by Stevenage Borough who won the competition in 2007 and 2009, and Barrow who won the competition in 1990. Although Stevenage Borough, who had won the Football Conference were pre-match favourites ahead of Barrow who had finished 15th, Barrow won 2–1 in extra time, after the match had ended in a 1–1 draw.

Club backgrounds

Stevenage Borough
Stevenage Borough were the first non-league team to appear three times at the new Wembley Stadium, London after winning two of the previous three FA Trophy competitions through victories in 2007 and 2009. Stevenage became the first team to win a competitive match, and subsequently, a competition trophy following the reconstruction of Wembley Stadium. The supporters of the club occupied the West End of Wembley Stadium and will do so again in the 2010 final.

Barrow
The last time Barrow appeared in the FA Trophy final was 1990, when they won 3–0 against Leek Town. They were making their first appearance at the redeveloped Wembley Stadium, in their second season in the Conference National following promotion from the Conference North.

Route to the Final

Match

Summary
Barrow seemed to begin the game more brightly out of the two sides, with three shots in the first ten minutes. It was on the ten-minute mark where, in Borough's first attack of the game, Andy Drury lashed a strike straight into the top corner of Barrow keeper Stuart Tomlinson's goal. This goal seemed to change the feel of the game, with Stevenage applying more and more pressure until, on 28 minutes, Stevenage midfielder David Bridges was shown a straight red card for serious foul play on Barrow No. 7, Andy Bond. The game was evenly balanced from then until half-time.

Barrow began the second-half brightly, creating plenty of chances; Stevenage had a few chances, however Barrow seemed to apply more and more pressure. On 79 minutes, substitute Lee McEvilly placed a header into the bottom right corner of Chris Day's net. Barrow exerted more and more pressure from then onwards, until 90 minutes when Borough keeper Day suffered an injury and was replaced by Ashley Bayes. Deep into added time when extra time seemed likely, Robin Hulbert went in for a challenge with his elbow, meaning the referee had no choice but to show red. Stevenage substitute Charlie Griffin had a huge amount of blood coming from his face, there was no way he could continue. They had already used all three subs, meaning the extra time was played 10 against 9 (Barrow 10 players, Stevenage 9).

The first half of extra time was even, but Barrow were possibly edging it. The second half of extra time could not have started better for Barrow as Jason Walker struck a stunning 25-yard strike into the top left corner of the goal. Barrow seemed to try and play the clock down and Stevenage had a few decent chances, before on 117 minutes Barrow had a 3-against-1 on the keeper, which amazingly, they missed. In the end, it didn't matter and the trophy went to Barrow.

Details

References

FA Trophy Finals
Fa Trophy Final
Fa Trophy Final
Fa Trophy Final
FA Trophy Final 2010
FA Trophy Final 2010
Events at Wembley Stadium